Go native or variants may refer to:

 Go Native, an Irish Thoroughbred racehorse

Going Native
Going Native, travel book by Eric Muspratt 1936
Going Native, by Oliver St John Gogarty  1940
Going Native, novel by Stephen Wright 1994

Going Native (revue), 1940-1941 Washington D.C. Loew's Theater revue  
 Going Native (South Park)

See also
 Clientitis, somewhat similar to "going native"
 Oikophobia, an aversion to home surroundings
 Off the verandah, a movement in early anthropology opposed to armchair theorising